Kendi may refer to
Kendi (name)
Kendi Island near Penang Island, Malaysia
Okenia kendi, a species of sea slug

See also
Kendis